Martin Lee and James Trotman were the defending champions, but Trotman did not compete. Lee played with David Sherwood but lost in the semifinals to Damien Roberts and Wesley Whitehouse.

Daniele Bracciali and Jocelyn Robichaud defeated Roberts and Whitehouse in the final, 6–2, 6–4 to win the boys' doubles tennis title at the 1996 Wimbledon Championships.

Seeds

  Daniele Bracciali /  Jocelyn Robichaud (champions)
  Damien Roberts /  Wesley Whitehouse (final)
  Yves Allegro /  Jean-Michel Pequery (quarterfinals)
  Ben Haran /  Simon Pender (semifinals)

Draw

Draw

References

External links

Boys' Doubles
Wimbledon Championship by year – Boys' doubles